is a manga series written and illustrated by Osamu Tezuka, published in Shogakukan's Weekly Shōnen Sunday from April 5, 1959, to September 6 of the same year.

Plot 
Dr. Thrill and his son Kenta are mystery aficionados who work as amateur detectives. Tezuka started writing stand alone chapters but, at the request of his editors, he later transformed Dr. Trill into a serial mystery.

Characters 

 Dr. Thrill – An avid fan of thrillers and detective stories. He works with his son and pet dog.
 Kenta – Dr. Thrill's son who has a keen sense of reason.
 Jip – Dr. Thrill and Kenta's dog whose quick actions come in handy when solving mysteries.
 Melon
 Kabocha
 Mari

Appearances in other series 
In the Sankei Newspaper Astroboy manga series, Astro travels back in time to 1969 & meets Shunsaku Ban's father, a doctor who runs the "Thrill Clinic". Jip the dog also makes a brief cameo appearance in the Astroboy story Plant People.

External links
 Dr. Thrill in the Tezuka World database
 

Osamu Tezuka manga
Shogakukan manga
Shōnen manga